Kalevi Oikarainen (27 April 1936 – 14 August 2020) was a Finnish cross-country skier who competed between the 1950s and the 1970s.

Oikarainen was born in Kuusamo. He won a bronze medal in the 4 × 10 km relay at the 1968 Winter Olympics in Grenoble and placed seventh in the 30 km event at those same games.

Oikarainen's biggest success was at the FIS Nordic World Ski Championships, where he earned a gold in 50 km in 1970 and a silver in the 4 × 10 km relay in 1966. He also won the 15 km event at the 1959 Holmenkollen ski festival.

He died on 14 August 2020 at the age of 84.

Cross-country skiing results
All results are sourced from the International Ski Federation (FIS).

Olympic Games
 1 medal – (1 bronze)

World Championships
 2 medals – (1 gold, 1 silver)

References

External links
 
  - click Vinnere for downloadable pdf file 
 

1936 births
2020 deaths
People from Kuusamo
Cross-country skiers at the 1968 Winter Olympics
Cross-country skiers at the 1972 Winter Olympics
Finnish male cross-country skiers
Holmenkollen Ski Festival winners
Olympic medalists in cross-country skiing
FIS Nordic World Ski Championships medalists in cross-country skiing
Medalists at the 1968 Winter Olympics
Olympic bronze medalists for Finland
Olympic cross-country skiers of Finland
Sportspeople from North Ostrobothnia
20th-century Finnish people